Michael A. Brown, CBE, DL, FInstP, FIET, FRSA, was the 2nd Vice-Chancellor of Liverpool John Moores University in Liverpool, England, United Kingdom between 2000 and 2011.

Education
He attended Bridgend Grammar School for Boys. In 1971, he obtained his PhD at the University of Nottingham with a thesis entitled Investigation of Phonon Scattering and Cross-relaxation by Paramagnetic Ions Using Thermal Conductivity Techniques.

100th Roscoe Lecture
In May 2011, Michael Brown delivered the 100th lecture of the Liverpool John Moores University Roscoe Lectures at the Liverpool Philharmonic Hall, as named after by William Roscoe.

References

External links
 https://web.archive.org/web/20080510182919/http://www.ljmu.ac.uk/ada/93783.htm Welcome/A message from Vice-Chancellor Michael Brown
 https://web.archive.org/web/20090218234301/http://ljmu.ac.uk/Governors/64915.htm#Professor%20Michael%20Brown

1946 births
Living people
21st-century British physicists
20th-century British physicists
Commanders of the Order of the British Empire
Deputy Lieutenants of Merseyside
Fellows of the Institute of Physics
People educated at Ysgol Brynteg
People from Hereford
Vice-Chancellors of Liverpool John Moores University